Habitat (a trading name of Argos Limited), is a brand of household furnishings in the United Kingdom and the main homewares brand within the Sainsbury's group.

Founded in 1964 by Sir Terence Conran, it merged with a number of other retailers in the 1980s to create Storehouse plc, before being sold to the Ikano Group, owned by the Kamprad family, in 1992. In December 2009, Habitat was bought by Hilco, a restructuring specialist. On 24 June 2011, the company was put into liquidation and all but three UK Habitat stores were closed in a deal to sell the indebted furniture chain, with the brand and the three London stores sold to Home Retail Group. In September 2016, UK retailer Sainsbury's bought Home Retail Group, including Argos and Habitat, for £1.4 billion (about $1.85 billion).

History

Beginning
Sir Terence Conran founded Habitat in London in 1964, opening his own store to market his Summa range of furniture. The first store was opened in Fulham Road in Chelsea by Conran, his then wife Caroline, Philip Pollock and the model Pagan Taylor. This store became the Habitat template, with its quarry tiled floor, whitewashed brick walls, white-painted wooden-slatted ceilings and spotlights creating a feeling of space and focusing attention on the product. Conran has said the main reason for the shop's initial success was that Habitat was one of the few places that sold cheap pasta storage jars just as the market for dried pasta took off in the UK.

Expansion
The business expanded quickly in the UK throughout the 1960s, with the first store outside London opening in Manchester  and internationally with the first overseas store opening in 1973 in Paris. Habitat also published a catalogue that showed a range of products grouped together in pleasant surroundings.

Mergers
In 1968 Habitat merged with the stationery retailer Ryman to form Ryman Conran. The following year it purchased the business of Lupton Morton, which mostly supplied furniture to offices and corporations but also made pieces by other designers, and in 1970 acquired the retail chain Straker-Bedser.

By 1970 the turnover of the group had doubled since the merger with Habitat. Terence Conran however was disappointed that Habitat itself had not been expanded and offered to purchase Habitat from Ryman Conran along with Conran Associates and the remains of Lupton Morton. Ryman Conran did not highly value the Habitat chain and apparently thought it was making a loss, so agreed to the sale. Ryman Conran retained Habitat's original factory in Thetford along with Conran Design Group.

In 1981, the company's shares were floated on the London Stock Exchange and in 1982 it merged with Mothercare Group to form Habitat Mothercare Group plc. The now-listed company bought the furniture retailer Heal's and the Richard Shops fashion chain in 1983. In 1986, the company merged with British Home Stores to form Storehouse plc. The merger with British Home Stores also came with a 50% share of the SavaCentre hypermarket chain, a 50:50 Joint Enterprise with the supermarket chain Sainsbury's.

Subsequent buyouts
In 1992 Habitat was purchased from Storehouse by Ikano. In October 2009, following several years of trading losses, the Kamprad family, which owns Ikano, put the company up for sale, and it was sold to Hilco, a restructuring specialist, in December 2009 with the Kamprad family writing off the debts of the company and providing €50 million (£45 million) of working capital while Hilco paid about €15m.

Administration and sales
On 24 June 2011 Hilco, which had owned Habitat UK Ltd since December 2009, announced that it was putting the company into administration.

Home Retail Group (owner of Argos and Homebase) purchased the Habitat brand, three central London stores in Tottenham Court Road, King's Road and Finchley Road  and the UK website for £24.5 million. The UK business was registered under the name Habitat Retail Ltd, a wholly owned subsidiary of Home Retail Group. Home Retail Group retained about 100 staff at the London stores and around 50 in head office, including many of Habitat's in-house designers, buyers and merchandisers. It then introduced 84 Mini Habitat stores within Homebase branches and also begun to offer a selection of Habitat products in 200 Homebase and Argos stores nationwide and on the Argos and Homebase websites.

By June 2011, all other Habitat stores in the UK had been closed by Hilco with around 750 employees being made redundant.

Cafom, a company registered in France, purchased Habitat's European businesses.

Habitat turns 50
To mark its 50th birthday in 2014, Habitat commissioned five past designers – Aaron Probyn, Simon Pengelly, Claire Norcross, Sarah Campbell & Shin Azumi – from its design studio to create a collection of celebratory products, as well as contemporary graphic artist James Joyce to create a one-off celebratory logo.

Purchase by Sainsbury's
In April 2016, Home Retail Group agreed to a £1.4bn takeover by UK retailer Sainsbury's. The deal included the sale of brands Argos and Habitat. The acquisition completed on 2 September 2016. Before the acquisition Home Retail Group sold the Homebase brand to the Australian brand Wesfarmers and all Habitat branches within Homebase stores were subsequently closed.

Leadership
Habitat was under the leadership of Managing Director Clare Askem between 2011 and 2019. In November 2019, Sainsbury's integrated Habitat's management into its own team by giving James Brown, its General Merchandise and Clothing Commercial Director, responsibility for the Habitat brand. In June 2020 Mr Brown left Sainsbury's and in November 2020 he was replaced by Sainsbury's Director of Business Development, Mike Luck.

The in-house London design studio was led by Creative Director Polly Dickens between 2012 and 2018. In 2018 she left the business and was replaced by Habitat's Senior Design Manager Kate Butler, who assumed the role of Head of Product Design.

Current operations
Habitat is the main homewares and furnishings brand within the Sainsbury's group. It is part of the Sainsbury's Argos business which runs general merchandise and clothing operations including Habitat, Argos, Sainsbury's Home products and Tu clothing. As a result of being part of this wider group, customers can also purchase a wide range of Habitat products from Argos stores or online. Larger Sainsbury's supermarkets also have Habitat homewares available among their normal Sainsbury's Home stock. In November 2020 Sainsbury's announced that it wanted to have 80% of homewares and furniture sold within the Sainsbury's group under the Habitat brand by the end of 2021.

On 27 May 2021, Sainsbury's confirmed that, as part of its integration of Habitat into its sister chain Argos, the trade, assets and liabilities of Habitat Retail Limited had been transferred to Argos Limited on 5 February 2021. This means that Habitat is now a trading name of Argos and not a company in its own right.

Habitat stores
Habitat as of July 2021 has one London flagship showroom in Westfield White City (4,700 sq ft), one flagship showroom in Brighton (6,500 sq ft) and one standalone showroom in Leeds opposite a Sainsbury's supermarket (2,000 sq ft).

In April 2016 Habitat unveiled a £1.5million refurbishment of its flagship 25,000 Tottenham Court Road store. Designed by the Habitat in-house Design Studio, the new store featured a completely new look and layout for the brand with a stripped back design and monochrome colour palette to highlight Habitat's bright product collections.

The Habitat store on King's Road in London closed in 2018. This was because the building it had occupied since 1973 is being redeveloped under plans submitted by the landowner Cadogan Estates and approved by the Kensington & Chelsea Council.

In 2018, the business opened two new standalone stores - one in Westfield White City as part of the extension of the shopping centre which was planned to attract more homeware and lifestyle brands and the other in Brighton; this was the location of one of Habitat's most successful Homebase concessions.

Sainsbury's announced in November 2020 that both the Habitat standalone stores in Tottenham Court Road (25,000 sq ft) and Finchley Road (18,000 sq ft) would close at the beginning of 2021, saying that it wanted to concentrate on selling Habitat products in its supermarkets and online. As of July 2021 the Tottenham Court Road store is now closed with the Habitat sign removed from the building and the store empty.

E-commerce website
Habitat also has a transactional UK website, as well as offering a selection of Habitat products on the Argos website.

In January 2009, Habitat began planning a fully transactional web site to enter the online shopping market. The site was launched in November 2009, based on an E-commerce application from BT Expedite, with a back-end by LShift, after a period when only a small number of products were available online. Following feedback, the company announced a new website in January 2011, offering online delivery to UK, Germany and Republic of Ireland.

Offices and warehouses locations 
Habitat's registered office is at the Sainsbury's Argos offices in Milton Keynes, however the business is predominantly based out of Saffron House, Farringdon. The businesses home delivery operation is based from Argos' Acton Gate warehouse. The customer services department are based in the Sainsbury's Argos call centre at Widnes, Cheshire.

Former operations

Argos concessions
Habitat used to have an in-store concession inside an Argos store in Edinburgh which opened at the end of 2016 but closed at the beginning of 2019.

Homebase concessions
Between October 2012 and September 2016, Habitat's then parent company, Home Retail Group, operated 84 Mini Habitat concessions in Homebase stores nationwide, beginning with Ruislip, followed by Solihull, Ewell, Battersea, Horsham, Orpington, Leeds, Bracknell and Truro. By the end of 2013 Habitat said there would be 14 Mini Habitat stores across the UK. With the demerger of Homebase from Home Retail Group to the Australian retailer Wesfarmers, all Mini Habitat concessions were removed from Homebase.

Sainsbury's concessions
There were 11 smaller Mini Habitat format branches located in Sainsbury's stores measuring between 1,400 sq ft and 2,000 sq ft between 2016 and 2020. The first three were opened at the end of 2016 and were located in Nine Elms in London, London Colney (a former SavaCentre) and Solihull.

The in-store concession opened in 2017 in the Sainsbury's hypermarket in Calcot, Berkshire was actually a re-instalment, as that store sold Habitat products in the late 1980s and early 1990s when it was a SavaCentre (a 50:50 BHS-Sainsbury Joint Enterprise) hypermarket when both BHS and Habitat were part of Storehouse plc.

Sainsbury's announced in 2020 that it would be permanently closing all 11 Habitat in-store concessions in its supermarkets with immediate effect, as its products would now be sold in the main self-service non-food areas of Sainsbury's supermarkets instead.

International operations
The company used to have stores in Galway and Dublin in the Republic of Ireland but these were closed down in 2008. Habitat previously employed 1,574 staff and operated in 71 stores: 35 in the UK, 26 in France, five in Spain and five in Germany (as of October 2009). The international operations are now run by Groupe Habitat, part of Cafom between 2011 and 2020 and since 2020 owned by the industrialist Thierry Le Guénic.

Product ranges

2017 collaborations
May 2016 & April 2017: British fashion designer Henry Holland collaborates with UK design brand Habitat to launch his first interiors collection. Launching at Habitat's Tottenham Court Road flagship store in London, the capsule collection of limited edition designs features a series of prints taken from the SS16 House of Holland season translated across a range of textiles and upholstery. Following its success, a second collection was launched in April 2017.

Jackson & Levine

June 2017: Supper club duo Laura Jackson and Alice Levine launch their debut homeware range with design brand Habitat. The capsule collection of hand-woven table and kitchen linens coincides with the launch of Jackson and Levine's first book – Round to Ours – and has been designed to reflect the pair's distinctive stylistic approach to their own East-End supper clubs.

References

External links
Official UK website

Furniture retailers of the United Kingdom
Retail companies established in 1964
British design
Retail companies based in London
Companies formerly listed on the London Stock Exchange
Conran family
Sainsbury's
Companies that have entered administration in the United Kingdom